The 2009–10 season of Everton F.C. was Everton's 18th season in the Premier League and 56th consecutive season in the top division of English football. The club began their preseason friendly schedule on 10 July 2009 and concluded the summer friendlies on 7 August. Everton began their Premier League season at home in Goodison Park with a 6–1 defeat by Arsenal, the worst defeat by the North London side since a 7–0 loss in 2005. Everton's poor form continued throughout most of the first half of the season; they found themselves in 16th place, only two points clear of the relegation zone, at Christmas, though their league form improved significantly from that time. Everton entered the League Cup in the Third Round against Hull City, a match they won, but the club was eliminated in the next round by Tottenham Hotspur. They also entered the FA Cup in the Third Round Proper and were eliminated in the Fourth Round by Birmingham City.

The Toffees also qualified for the Europa League, for which Everton qualified based upon their fifth-place finish in the 2008–09 Premier League, entering in the play-off round; Everton advanced through the group stage and were ultimately defeated 4–2 on aggregate by Portuguese club Sporting CP in the Round of 32. Everton finished the Premier League season in eighth place, failing to qualify for any European competitions for the first time since the 2005–06 season. The club ended the league campaign very strongly, suffering only two defeats in their final 24 league games.

Matches

Pre-season friendlies

Premier League

August 
Everton began its Premier League season at home at Goodison Park against Arsenal on 15 August 2009. The Toffees were never competitive in the match and were defeated 6–1, the worst opening day loss by Everton and tied for worst opening day loss in Premier League history. Everton's second match was due to be away to Manchester City, but the match was postponed due to Everton's Europa League match with Sigma Olomouc. In their second Premier League match, Everton fell 1–0 at Turf Moor against Premier League newcomers Burnley, again producing little in the way of offence, including a Saha penalty kick that missed to the right. The losing streak was halted in the third match of the season when Everton defeated Wigan Athletic at Goodison Park, the game-winner coming in the form of a second-half, Leighton Baines penalty kick during injury time.

September 
The next match, in September, saw Everton take an early lead at Craven Cottage, but captain Phil Neville went down to a knee injury in the second half as the Toffees fell 2–1 to Fulham. Neville, who tore the posterior cruciate ligament in his knee, is expected to avoid surgery and return to play after a three-month layoff. Everton then returned to Goodison Park and, behind two goals from Louis Saha and one from Joseph Yobo, easily dispatched of Blackburn Rovers, 3–0. Everton then played away to Portsmouth and came away with a 1–0 victory thanks to Saha's fifth goal of the year. Steven Pienaar was carried off on a stretcher in the 60th minute with a knee injury after a hard challenge by Portsmouth captain Aaron Mokoena.

October 
Everton started October with a home match against Stoke City; the match was drawn 1–1, the game-tying goal coming from Leon Osman in the 55th minute, only five minutes after Stoke's Robert Huth had opened the scoring. In their next match, at home at Goodison Park, Everton drew with Wolverhampton Wanderers 1–1, with goals coming from Kevin Doyle and Diniyar Bilyaletdinov, his first goal for the club for the latter. Everton's run of bad form then continued with a 3–2 loss away to Bolton Wanderers. The match did, however, see Lucas Neill's first start for the club, and he assisted on both of Everton's goals, which were scored by Louis Saha and Marouane Fellaini, respectively. In their next match, Everton hosted Aston Villa, with the result being 1–1. Bilyaletdinov opened the scoring during first half injury time, but the goal was cancelled out with John Carew's 47th-minute strike. Both teams ended the game with ten players after Bilyaletdinov and Carlos Cuéllar were sent off in the last five minutes.

November 

Moving into November, Everton ended its four match winless streak with a 2–1 victory over West Ham at the Boleyn Ground with Everton's goals coming from striker Louis Saha and young midfielder Dan Gosling. This would however be Everton's last win in November with losses occurring against Manchester United, Hull City and Merseyside Derby rivals Liverpool. In the game against Manchester United at Old Trafford, Everton were defeated 0–3 with goals from Darren Fletcher, Michael Carrick and Antonio Valencia.
The match against Hull City played midweek at the KC Stadium again saw Everton lose 2–3 with Hull's goals all coming in the first half and Everton's two in the second half. Hull saw goals scored from Stephen Hunt, Andy Dawson and Dean Marney while Everton's goal was scored by Louis Saha from the penalty spot while the other goal was a Kamil Zayatte own goal as well as the return of Steven Pienaar. In the next, The Merseyside Derby, Everton hosted Liverpool in a match that saw the return of some of Everton's better form despite losing the match 0–2 with goals for Liverpool coming from a Joseph Yobo own goal and Dirk Kuyt.

December 
In Everton's first match of December they came from 2 goals down to draw 2–2 with Tottenham Hotspur at Goodison Park. After going down to goals from Jermain Defoe and Michael Dawson, Everton started their comeback through Louis Saha and then Tim Cahill's equaliser and finished after Tim Howard saved the point for Everton by stopping a late penalty by Defoe. Everton's next match was a 3–3 draw away to league-leaders Chelsea in which Everton twice came from behind to tie the score. Saha put Everton ahead in the 12th minute when his header deflected off the post and then the back of Petr Čech for an own goal. Didier Drogba and Nicolas Anelka put Chelsea ahead but Yakubu drew the score in the fifth minute of first half injury time. Drogba, who threatened throughout the match as Chelsea held 65% of possession, put away his second of the match in the 59th minute. However, the draw was sealed in the 64th minute when a Drogba clear hit the back of Saha and bounced into the Chelsea goal. The Toffees earned the third straight draw the following week against Birmingham City – who entered the match on a five match winning streak, the best in the Premier League at that time – at Goodison Park. Compared to their previous match against Chelsea, the Birmingham match was a role reversal for Everton, who had more corners, 7–3, and attempted more shots, 17–2, than Birmingham, but were unable to break through after Bilyaletdinov's fifth-minute strike. On the day, Everton's finishing was poor as evidenced by 14 of their 17 total attempted shots being off target.

The club earned their fourth consecutive Premier League draw of the season at the Stadium of Light on 26 December. Both teams played well, and Sunderland clung to a one-goal lead for much of the match after Darren Bent converted a header from Kenwyne Jones in the 17th minute. Everton pressed hard in the remainder of the match, particularly during the second half, and were rewarded in the 85th minute when Fellaini finished a Tony Hibbert cross. In their final match of 2009, on 28 December, the Blues were able to end they calendar year on a positive note as they earned their first win in over seven weeks – and first victory at home in over three months – defeating Burnley at Goodison Park, 2–0. Both goals game last in the second half, James Vaughan tallying in the 83rd minute – his first goal in two years – and Steven Pienaar during extra time. Both scores came after Stephen Jordan was sent off in the 62nd minute when he earned his second yellow card of the day. Burnley manager Owen Coyle criticised the referee after the match, believing the Everton's go-ahead goal had been scored with Yakubu in an offside position.

January 

The Toffees kicked off 2010 on 9 January with an impressive 2–2 draw away to Arsenal, who had defeated Everton 6–1 at Goodison Park in the season opener. It was one of only two matches played in the Premier League on the weekend, the rest of which were cancelled due to a nationwide blizzard. New American loanee Landon Donovan made his debut, harassing Arsenal defender Armand Traoré throughout the match – and tallied an assist in the 12th minute on a curling corner kick that was headed past Manuel Almunia by Leon Osman. Denílson levelled the score in the 28th when his shot deflected off Osman. Everton again took the lead when Pienaar struck put one away in the 81st. When it appeared that Everton were going to get their first win at Emirates Stadium, but a Tomáš Rosický shot deflected off Lucas Neill and into the twine as Arsenal were able to salvage the draw. Easily Everton's strongest performance to that point of the season, Arsenal manager Arsène Wenger praised the Toffees after the match, saying "We gained one point, because we were closer to losing this game than winning it... For the biggest part of this match Everton were more dangerous, sharper than us."

Results

Final league table

FA Cup 
Everton entered the 2009–10 FA Cup at the third round and were drawn at home against Carlisle United of League One. It was a closely fought match in which Carlisle United matched Everton for much of the match. James Vaughan scored the opening tally against the run of play in the twelfth minute, but Carlisle's Kevan Hurst equalised only six minutes later. Carlisle nearly took the lead in the seventieth minute, but the Danny Livesey attempt was partially saved by Tim Howard and rang the crossbar. Everton were finally able to take hold of the match in the eight-second minute when Phil Neville knocked in the winner. Leighton Baines sealed the match with a penalty shot that had been earned by substitute Kieran Agard in the fifth minute of extra time. For the Fourth Round, Everton were drawn to face Birmingham City, who won their third round replay with Nottingham Forest. Everton were unable to duplicate the FA Cup run of the previous season as they were eliminated by Birmingham City, 2–1, in front of their home crowd at Goodison Park. Christian Benítez opened the scoring for Birmingham in the seventh minute, and Barry Ferguson doubled the lead in the 40th minute. Leon Osman added a goal for Everton, but for the Toffees, it was too little too late.

Football League Cup
Everton entered the League Cup at the third round stage. They were drawn away against Hull City; the game was played on 22 September. Everton qualified for the fourth round of the competition with a 4–0 victory away at Hull with goals from Jô, Dan Gosling, Leon Osman and Yakubu, who made his first start on return from his achilles injury. The game was also the debut of new signing Lucas Neill who came on as a second-half substitute. Everton, debuting their all-purple alternate kit, were eliminated from the League Cup in their second match, a 2–0 loss away to Tottenham Hotspur in the Round of 16.

Europa League

Everton opened play in the Europa League in the play-off round and were drawn against Czech club Sigma Olomouc, who finished fourth in the 2008–09 Gambrinus liga. Sigma had already advanced through two rounds of the Europa League, having dispatched of Icelandic club Fram in the Second Qualifying Round and Scottish club Aberdeen in the Third Qualifying Round by aggregate scores of 3–1 and 8–1, respectively. Everton took a 4–0 lead at home in the first leg. In the return leg in Olomouc, Tony Hibbert was sent off in the seventh minute, but Everton were able to hold strong, earning a 1–1 draw for the 5–1 aggregate victory.

The Toffees were next drawn into Group I in the Group Stage with Greek club AEK Athens, Belarusian club BATE Borisov, and Portuguese club Benfica. Everton opened their first match in the group stage with a 4–0 home victory against AEK Athens. Everton then continued their perfect start to the group stage with a 2–1, come-from-behind victory over BATE Borisov, with goals from Marouane Fellaini and Tim Cahill cancelling out Dzmitry Likhtarovich's 16th-minute opener. The Toffees, heavily depleted by injuries, were handed their first loss of Europa League play in their third Group Stage match away to Benfica, losing 5–0, the worst defeat Everton had ever suffered during European play. This loss was followed a fortnight later by a second loss to Benfica in Everton's home tie, the scoreline ending 2–0 and goals coming from Javier Saviola and Óscar Cardozo, who each had already scored two goals apiece in Benfica's previous win over Everton. In their next match, Everton travelled to Athens to play AEK Athens, winning the match 1–0 thanks to Bilyaletdinov's 6th-minute goal. The win allowed Everton to qualify for the knockout stage with one group stage game to spare thanks to Benfica's victory away to BATE. The win, however, was somewhat soured by injuries suffered by Jô, Sylvain Distin and Dan Gosling. In the Toffees' final group stage match, with several senior starters injured and the club having already secured passage into the knockout rounds, David Moyes fielded a young side against BATE. In all, seven teenagers saw action on the evening, including five who received their first senior cap. In the match, two Everton records were set: Tony Hibbert set the club record for European caps with 20, and Jake Bidwell set the record for youngest senior cap in European play at only 16 years and 271 days. BATE was able to control possession for much of the match and came away as victors in their final European match of the season.

For the Round of 32, Everton were drawn against Portuguese side Sporting CP, with the winner advancing to face the winner of Atlético Madrid–Galatasaray. As a result of UEFA regulations, Everton were forced to move the first leg from the regular Thursday evening schedule to an early Tuesday kickoff, which resulted in less than 30,000 in attendance. The first leg was won 2–1 by Everton on the strength of goals by Sylvain Distin and Steven Pienaar. Distin, however, was penalised with a red card in the 85th minutes for a hard tackle in the box, which was converted from the penalty spot by Miguel Veloso. For the return leg, Everton's Nigerian contingent of Yakubu and Yobo were both initially denied entry into Portugal as a result of passport issues stemming from Portuguese foreign relations with Nigeria, but both players arrived via Amsterdam on the morning of the match. Sporting entered their home leg against Everton on a seven-match winless streak in all competitions, but they possessed the ball attacked the Everton back line early and often, defeating Everton 3–0 on the day and 4–2 on aggregate. The Toffees only managed four attempted shots in the match, only one of which was on target. Conversely, Tim Howard had a very busy night, facing nine shots on target and saving six. Miguel Veloso scored his second goal in as many games against Everton in the 65th minute, putting Sporting in control of the tie. Everton's hopes of forcing extra time remained alive after Pedro Mendes' 76th minute shot deflected off Jack Rodwell and into the net. As Everton put pressure on Sporting in injury time, Sporting put away the match on a counter-attack score by Matías Fernández.

Players

First team squad

Updated 15 March 2010.

Left club during season

Transfers

In

Out

Loans in

Loans out

Notes

 † Ruddy and Jutkiewicz were due to return to Everton in January 2010, but during January, their loans were extended to the end of the season.
 ‡ Vaughan was set to return in January – following a half-season loan to Derby – but returned on 9 October after less than a month on loan following surgery on a slight tear in his cartilage; Nigel Clough subsequently announced his desire to bring Vaughan back to Derby for a fresh half-season loan starting in January, but Vaughan later joined Leicester City on a one-month loan with an option of extending until the season's end, this option was taken up by Leicester on 12 April.

Statistics

Appearances

|}

Goalscorers

Disciplinary record
Last updated on 15 April 2010.	

 Player no longer at club is denoted by *.

End of Season Awards 
The Everton annual end of season awards night was held on 4 May 2010 at the Liverpool Cathedral.

Award Winners on the night were:
 Player of the Season – Steven Pienaar
 The chairman's Blueblood Award – Tim Howard and Tim Cahill
 Goal of the Season – Diniyar Bilyaletdinov vs. Manchester United 20 February 2010
 Young Player of the Year – Jack Rodwell
 Players' Player of the Season – Leighton Baines
 Reserve Player of the Season – Shane Duffy
 Academy Player of the Season – Adam Davies
 Special Recognition Award – Keith Tamlin
 Everton Ladies Player of the Season – Jill Scott

References

Notes

External links

 
 2009–10 results at official website
 BBC Sport – Club Stats
 Soccerbase – Results | Squad Stats | Transfers

2009–10 Premier League by team
2009-10